Lincoln Township is one of twelve townships in Audubon County, Iowa, United States. As of the 2010 census, its population was 285.

History
Lincoln Township was organized in 1876.

Geography
According to the USGS, it contains two cemeteries: Gray and Lincoln Township.

References

External links
 US-Counties.com
 City-Data.com

Townships in Audubon County, Iowa
Townships in Iowa
1876 establishments in Iowa
Populated places established in 1876